Frederic William Sington (February 24, 1910 – August 20, 1998) was an American football and baseball player. Sington was also an accomplished saxophonist. Sington was born in Birmingham, Alabama, and was Jewish. 
He attended Phillips High School.

College football
Sington was a prominent two-time All America tackle for Wallace Wade's Alabama Crimson Tide football teams. While in college he was a member of the Zeta Beta Tau fraternity, Psi chapter at the University of Alabama. He was elected to the College Football Hall of Fame in 1955. Sington was chosen for an Associated Press Southeast Area All-Time football team 1920–1969 era.

1930
In 1930, a year in which Alabama won the national championship and Sington was an All-American, Rudy Vallée wrote a song about Sington, entitled "Football Freddie", that would go on to become a nationwide hit.

Baseball
In 1932 he led the Middle Atlantic League with a batting average of .368 and a slugging percentage of .720, and in triples with 12 and home runs with 29. In 1936 he was third in the Southern Association with a batting average of .384 and a slugging percentage of .589, as he led the league with 22 triples.

He would also play professional baseball as an outfielder with the Brooklyn Dodgers and Washington Senators, batting .271/.382/.401 with 7 home runs and 85 RBI in 181 games.

Death and burial
He is buried in Birmingham's Elmwood Cemetery.

References

Sources
 Groom, Winston. The Crimson Tide – An Illustrated History. Tuscaloosa: The University of Alabama Press, 2000. .

External links

 
 

1910 births
1998 deaths
20th-century American journalists
American football tackles
American male journalists
American men's basketball players
Alabama Crimson Tide baseball players
Alabama Crimson Tide football players
Alabama Crimson Tide men's basketball players
Brooklyn Dodgers players
Major League Baseball outfielders
Washington Senators (1901–1960) players
World Football League announcers
Albany Senators players
Atlanta Crackers players
Beckley Black Knights players
Chattanooga Lookouts players
Columbus Foxes players
High Point Pointers players
Jackson Senators players
Louisville Colonels (minor league) players
All-American college football players
All-Southern college football players
College Football Hall of Fame inductees
Baseball players from Birmingham, Alabama
Players of American football from Birmingham, Alabama
Journalists from Alabama
Jewish American baseball players
Jewish Major League Baseball players
20th-century American Jews
Burials at Elmwood Cemetery (Birmingham, Alabama)